is a Japanese track and field athlete who specialises in the 400 metres and 800 metres. She was selected for the 4 × 400 metres relay member at the 2009 World Championships in Berlin at the age of 17, but did not compete. She won a gold medal in the 4 × 400 metres relay at the 2011 Asian Championships in Kobe with teammates Sayaka Aoki, Chisato Tanaka and Satomi Kubokura. She was also the 2011 Japanese champion in the 400 metres and a two-time Japanese champion in the 4 × 400 metres relay.

Personal bests

International competition

National titles

References

External links

Miho Shingu at JAAF 

1991 births
Living people
Sportspeople from Hiroshima Prefecture
Japanese female sprinters
Japanese female middle-distance runners
World Athletics Championships athletes for Japan
Japan Championships in Athletics winners